NCGS may refer to:Al-Nada center for general services 

 Non-celiac gluten sensitivity
 North Cestrian Grammar School, Altrincham, Cheshire